Chkalovsk is a town in Nizhny Novgorod Oblast, Russia, located on the right bank of the Volga River,  northwest of Nizhny Novgorod, the administrative center of the oblast. As of the 2010 Census, its population was 12,368.

It was previously known as Vasilyeva Sloboda/Vasilyovo (until 1938). It was renamed after its most famous inhabitant, the war hero Valeri Chkalov.

History

It has been known since the 12th century as Vasilyeva Sloboda, named so in honor of its founder Prince Vasily Yuryevich, the son of Yury Dolgoruky. For a long time the territory belonged to Prince Shuysky who eventually became Tsar Vasily Shuysky.

The famous Russian pilot Valery Chkalov was born in 1904 in Vasilyovo. In 1937, Vasilyovo was renamed Chkalovsk after him and in 1955 it was granted town status. Most of the original village was flooded by the Gorky Reservoir after the construction of Gorky Hydroelectric Station in 1955.

Administrative and municipal status
Within the framework of administrative divisions, it is, together with 228 rural localities, incorporated as the town of oblast significance of Chkalovsk—an administrative unit with the status equal to that of the districts. As a municipal division, the town of oblast significance of Chkalovsk is incorporated as Chkalovsk Urban Okrug.

Until May 2015, the town served as the administrative center of Chkalovsky District and, within the framework of administrative divisions, was incorporated within that district as a town of district significance. As a municipal division, it was incorporated as Chkalovsk Urban Settlement within Chkalovsky Municipal District.

References

Notes

Sources

External links
Official website of Chkalovsk 
Chkalovsk Business Directory 

Cities and towns in Nizhny Novgorod Oblast
Populated places on the Volga